Cardiff parkrun is a parkrun event that takes place every Saturday morning at 9am in Cardiff, Wales. The parkrun was the first in Wales and has become the second largest in the UK. The run was started on 16 Feb 2008 and celebrated its 10th anniversary in 2018 with its largest ever attendance.

The course
The course is an out and back run on the Taff trail along the River Taff, within Bute park, and on tarmac footpaths. Charlotte Arter set the women's parkrun world record time at the course on 5 January 2019 with a time of 15 minutes and 50 seconds. The men's record time for the course is 14 minutes and 24 seconds set by Ieuan Thomas. The event director set up nearby Grangemoor parkrun in 2015 and a third parkrun in Cardiff is planned to reduce congestion on the course.

Suspension
The event was briefly suspended in 2011 by Cardiff Council for health and safety reasons. The suspension was criticised by Kevin Brennan, the local member of parliament, and the Wales Online portal remarked that there is a parkrun in war-torn Afghanistan. The suspension was lifted several days later without interruption to the event.

Notable participants
Charlotte Arter, Welsh athlete and women's parkrun world record holder
Helen Jenkins, Welsh Olympian
Iwan Thomas, Welsh Commonwealth champion 
Kelly Holmes, double Olympic Champion

See also
 List of parkruns in the United Kingdom

References

Parkrun